Hong Kong Express is a 2005 South Korean television series starring Cho Jae-hyun, Song Yoon-ah, Cha In-pyo and Kim Hyo-jin. It aired on SBS from February 16 to April 7, 2005 on Wednesdays and Thursdays at 21:55 for 16 episodes.

Plot
Han Jung-yeon is an interior designer living in Hong Kong who's engaged to rich tycoon Choi Kang-hyuk. But before she can marry her rich boyfriend, she comes across her old flame Kang Min-soo. Adding to Jung-yeon's confusion about her love life, is a murder in which both men may be involved.

Cast
Main characters
Cho Jae-hyun as Kang Min-soo
Song Yoon-ah as Han Jung-yeon
Cha In-pyo as Choi Kang-hyuk
Kim Hyo-jin as Choi Ma-ri

Supporting characters
Oh Sang-moo as Song Doo-re
Lee Young-eun as Jo Bong-soon
Jung Ae-yeon as Jung Eun-ha
Jo Sang-ki as Kim Bi-seo
Yoon Hyun-sook as Hong Yoo-shin
Park Geun-hyung as chairman Choi Jae-sub
Kim Hye-ok as Ms. Min
Park Jung-soo as Shin Kyung-ja
Kim Sung-kyum as Professor Han
Shin Dong-wook as Joo Young-yuk
Kim Eun-soo as Jennifer

Notes

See also
List of Korean television shows
Contemporary culture of South Korea
Action drama
Republic of Korea

References

External links
Hong Kong Express official SBS website 

2005 South Korean television series debuts
2005 South Korean television series endings
Seoul Broadcasting System television dramas
Korean-language television shows
Aviation television series
South Korean thriller television series
Television series by IHQ (company)